While Abul-Qasim Babur Mirza was away from Herat crushing the revolt of Amir Hendugha in Asterabad, Ala al-Dawla Mirza, his older brother, managed to escape from prison in Herat and went straight to his youngest brother Sultan Muhammad Mirza's province of Fars seeking his protection. Sultan Muhammad Mirza and Ala al-Dawla Mirza then marched with a large army and invaded Khurasan in 1449. This was the same time as the revolt of Abdal-Latif Mirza in Balkh against his father Ulugh Beg at Samarkand. While the father and son were busy facing off at the Amu Darya in the north, the Baysonqor brothers were about to engage in battle in Khurasan. Abul-Qasim Babur Mirza marched to face his brothers in battle and the two armies met at Farhadgerd. Sultan Muhammad Mirza and Ala al-Dawla Mirza defeated Abul-Qasim Babur Mirza who fled to the castle of Omad. Sultan Muhammad Mirza entered Herat and freed Ibrahim Mirza son of Ala al-Dawla Mirza. Abdal-Latif Mirza, who before the battle had sent an envoy to Abul-Qasim Babur Mirza professing peace during his revolt against his father Ulugh Beg, now congratulated Sultan Muhammad Mirza in taking Herat. But Sultan Muhammad Mirza was saddened by Ulugh Beg's defeat at Dimishq and his murder en route to Makkah by his son; however, he decided not to pursue a war in Transoxiana and instead wanted to concentrate on his holdings in Iraq-i-Ajam, Fars and now Khurasan as well.

Meanwhile, Abul-Qasim Babur Mirza quickly moved to attack Asterabad as the governor appointed by Sultan Muhammad Mirza had oppressed the people of that place. Eventually the two brothers would fight each other again at Asterabad.

Farhadgerd
Farhadgerd
1449 in Asia
Farhadgerd
History of Razavi Khorasan Province
1440s in the Middle East